Kim Yu-jin (born 13 April 1991) is a South Korean taekwondo practitioner. 

She won a gold medal in women's bantamweight event at the 2013 World Taekwondo Championships in Puebla, by defeating Yamisel Núñez in the semifinal, and Ana Zaninović in the final.

She competed in the women's featherweight event at the 2022 World Taekwondo Championships held in Guadalajara, Mexico.

References

External links

1991 births
Living people
South Korean female taekwondo practitioners
World Taekwondo Championships medalists
Medalists at the 2019 Summer Universiade
Universiade gold medalists for South Korea
Universiade medalists in taekwondo
21st-century South Korean women